When I Send You a Picture of Berlin: You'll Know It's Over, Over There is a World War I song written and composed by Frank Fay, Ben Ryan and Dave Dreyer. Written for voice and piano, this song was published in 1918 by Harry Von Tilzer Music Publishing Co., in New York, NY. The cover, illustrated by Pfeiffer Illustrating Co., depicts a soldier with a camera while in the background the cavalry rides through a monument. The song was recorded by Arthur Fields & the Peerless Quartet.

The sheet music can be found at the Pritzker Military Museum & Library.

References

External links 
 Front cover of music Sheet music cover and song MP3 at the Illinois Digital Archive.

1918 songs
Songs of World War I
Songs about Berlin
Songs with music by Dave Dreyer
Songs written by Ben Ryan (composer)